The state auditor of Mississippi is an elected official in the executive branch of Mississippi's state government. The duty of the state auditor is to ensure accountability in the use of funds appropriated by the state legislature by inspecting and reporting on the expenditure of the public funds.

Shad White is the incumbent state auditor of Mississippi as of 2022. He assumed office on July 17, 2018.

History of the office 
The position of state auditor was enumerated as part of the executive branch in Mississippi's first constitution in 1817. The office was filled by the choice of the Mississippi Legislature. The first auditor, John R. Girault, was elected on December 19, 1817. The 1832 constitution stipulated that the auditor was to be popularly elected to serve a two-year term. The 1869 Constitution extended the term to four years.

The fourth Constitution of Mississippi, ratified in 1890, made the state auditor ineligible to hold consecutive terms, and barred the state auditor and state treasurer from immediately succeeding each other. This measure was implemented as an effort to prevent collusion between the two officeholders, after a series of embezzlements and misuses of public funds during the Reconstruction era. A 1966 constitutional amendment lifted the prohibitions, making the state auditor eligible to serve consecutive terms. In 1986, the Constitution Committee of the Mississippi House voted to approve a proposal to limit the state auditor to a ten-year tenure, but the measure was rejected by the full House after initially being passed by the state senate. The 1890 constitution also required the auditor to publish a report of all expenses incurred by the legislature during its sessions, though this responsibility was transferred to a different officer in 1989.

In 1993 some employees in the Department of Audit's investigative division were made law enforcement officers. Originally restricted to exercising the power of arrest only after an individual had been indicted by a court following an auditing investigation, in 2003 the officers were granted full arrest powers and thus permitted to arrest anyone for any crime they detected in the course of their duties.

Hamp King, who held the office from 1964 to 1984, was the first certified public accountant to serve as state auditor. Ray Mabus, who became auditor in 1984, raised the public profile of the office through a crackdown on corruption.

Powers, duties, and structure 
Under Article 5, Section 134, of the Mississippi Constitution, the state auditor is elected every four years. Candidates for the office must meet the same constitutional qualifications as candidates for the position of secretary of state; they must be at least 25 years old and have lived in the state for at least five years. They are elected to a four-year term without term limits. 

The state auditor is responsible for auditing state agencies, county governments, school districts, and tertiary educational institutions. They also conduct data audits for public schools and monitor state agencies' inventory. They advise local governments on accounting matters in accordance with Generally Accepted Accounting Principles and relevant laws, and investigate misuse of public funds. The office lacks the ability to prosecute cases of criminal wrongdoing in court and, in such instances where wrongdoing is believed to have occurred, typically turns over its findings to other prosecutors.

The Department of Audit has approximately 150 employees, including about 40 certified public accountants. It has four divisions: Financial and Compliance Audit Division, Investigative Division, Government Accountability Division, and the Technical Assistance Division. The auditor's salary is $90,000 per year, but is set to increase to $150,000 annually in 2024.

List of auditors
Source: Mississippi Official & Statistical Register

Territorial auditors (1798–1817)
 Charles B. Howell
 Beverly R. Grayson
 Park Walton

State auditors (1817–present)

References

Works cited 

 
"Constitution of the State of Mississippi" (current, 1890 with amendments). Mississippi Secretary of State (Education and Publications). Retrieved March 19, 2021.
"Constitution of the State of Mississippi" (1890). Mississippi History Now. Archived from the original on October 9, 2016. Retrieved March 19, 2021.
"Constitution of the State of Mississippi" (1868). Mississippi History Now. Archived from the original on April 21, 2016. Retrieved March 19, 2021.
"Constitution of the State of Mississippi" (1832). Mississippi History Now. Archived from the original on October 9, 2016. Retrieved March 19, 2021.
"Constitution of the State of Mississippi" (1817). Mississippi History Now. Archived from the original on October 9, 2016. Retrieved March 19, 2021.

External links
 Mississippi State Auditor website

MIssissippi